Caught in the Middle may refer to:

 Caught in the Middle (album), by Linear
 "Caught in the Middle" (A1 song), 2002
 "Caught in the Middle" (Anastacia song), 2017
 "Caught in the Middle" (Paramore song), 2018
 "Caught in the Middle", by Juliet Roberts
 "Caught in the Middle", by Dio from the 1983 album Holy Diver
"Caught in the Middle", by Charli XCX from the 2014 album Sucker

See also 
 Stuck in the Middle (disambiguation)
 In the Middle (disambiguation)